The Jenolan River, a perennial river that is part of the Hawkesbury-Nepean catchment, is located in the Central Tablelands region of New South Wales, Australia.

Course and features
The Jenolan River rises below Black Mount on the eastern slopes of the Great Dividing Range southeast of Oberon, and flows generally southeast and east, joined by one minor tributary, before reaching its confluence with the Coxs River below Mount Jenolan. The river descends  over its  course.

See also 

 Jenolan Caves
 List of rivers of Australia
 List of rivers of New South Wales (A–K)
 Rivers of New South Wales

References 

Rivers of New South Wales
Central Tablelands
Oberon Council